Ascophanus is a genus of fungi in the Ascobolaceae family. The genus has a widespread distribution (especially in temperate areas), and contains 20 species, most of which grow on dung.

Selected species 

 Note : this list is not complete.

Ascophanus bresadolae Boud.
Ascophanus cinerellus (P. Karst.) Speg.
Ascophanus coemansii Boud.
Ascophanus consociatus (Berk. & Broome) W. Phillips
Ascophanus globosopulvinatus (Crossl.) Boud. ex Ramsb.
Ascophanus glumarum (Desm.) Boud.
Ascophanus minutellus (P. Karst.) P. Karst.
Ascophanus minutissimus Boud.
Ascophanus subfuscus (P. Crouan & H. Crouan) Boud.

 List source :

References

Pezizales
Pezizales genera
Taxa named by Jean Louis Émile Boudier